Alison Wall (born 1966 in Auckland) is an actress and a comedian, best known for her role as Minya in the American TV series Xena: Warrior Princess.

Biography

Career
Wall is a comedy veteran, having worked on New Zealand comedy shows Issues, That Comedy Show and Comedy Central – having later played the comedic Minya on the TV series Xena: Warrior Princess and voiced both the Greek Titanesses Tethys and Mnemosyne on the animated movie Hercules and Xena – The Battle for Mount Olympus (1998).

Wall hasn't acted since 2001.

Filmography

Awards
Wall won on 1998 in the category Best Performer in the Comedy, in a vote made for the TV Guide.

External links
 
 An interview with Alison Wall''

1966 births
Living people
New Zealand television actresses
New Zealand voice actresses
New Zealand women comedians
People from Auckland